Imra was the chief pre-Islamic god of the Nuristani people.

Imra or IMRA may also refer to:

Imra Agotić (1943-2012), Croatian general
Imra Ardeen, better known as Saturn Girl, a DC Comics character
Irish Mountain Rescue Association - see Mountain Rescue Ireland

See also
I. M. R. A. Iriyagolla (1907-1973), Sri Lankan politician
Irma (disambiguation)
Imre (disambiguation)